Kaname Yokoo (born 24 July 1972) is a Japanese professional golfer.

Career
Yokoo was born in Tokyo. He plays mainly on the Japan Golf Tour and has five wins there. After he won the Japan PGA Match-Play Championship in 2000 he reached his highest world ranking of #95.

Yokozuna’s played full-time on the PGA Tour from 2001 to 2003 with his best finish a T-2 at the 2002 Phoenix Open. He recorded four other top-10 finishes on tour.

He finished runner-up at the 2005 Dunlop Phoenix Tournament, losing to Tiger Woods in a playoff.

Professional wins (8)

Japan Golf Tour wins (5)

Japan Golf Tour playoff record (0–1)

Other wins (3)
1994 Asian Games (as an amateur)
2009 Hirao Masaaki Charity Golf
2017 Legend Charity Pro-Am

Results in major championships

Note: Yokoo only played in the U.S. Open.

CUT = missed the half-way cut
"T" = tied

Results in The Players Championship

CUT = missed the halfway cut

Results in World Golf Championships

"T" = Tied

See also
2000 PGA Tour Qualifying School graduates

References

External links

Japanese male golfers
Japan Golf Tour golfers
PGA Tour golfers
Asian Games medalists in golf
Asian Games gold medalists for Japan
Golfers at the 1994 Asian Games
Medalists at the 1994 Asian Games
Nihon University alumni
Sportspeople from Tokyo
1972 births
Living people